Visible Idea of Perfection is a debut album by the Indonesian hard rock band, The S.I.G.I.T. It was released in 2006 in Indonesia by FFWD Records; in 2007 in Australia by Caveman! Records.

This record includes its most popular track "Black Amplifier," and fans-favorite love ballad "All the Time."

Track listing
All tracks written and composed by The S.I.G.I.T.
"Black Amplifier" 2:36
"Horse" 2:06
"No Hook" 2:42
"New Generation" 2:59
"Nowhere End" 3:46
"Live in New York" 2:32
"Clove Doper" 2:44
"Soul Sister" 3:49
"Save Me" 2:41
"Let It Go" 3:45
"All the Time" 3:18
"Alright" 2:32
Satan State" 3:33
"Provocateur" (Bonus track) 2:05

References

2007 debut albums
The S.I.G.I.T. albums